The white tern or common white tern (Gygis alba) is a small seabird found across the tropical oceans of the world. It is sometimes known as the fairy tern, although this name is potentially confusing as it is also the common name of Sternula nereis. Other names for the species include angel tern and white noddy in English, and manu-o-Kū in Hawaiian. The little white tern (Gygis microrhyncha), previously considered a subspecies of the white tern (Gygis alba microrhyncha), is now recognised as a separate species.

Taxonomy
The white tern was first formally described by the Swedish naturalist Anders Sparrman in 1786 under the binomial name Sterna alba. The genus Gygis was introduced by the German zoologist Johann Georg Wagler in 1832. The name Gygis is from the Ancient Greek  for a mythical bird and the specific  is Latin for "white".

Molecular phylogenetic studies have shown that the white tern is more closely related to the noddies than it is to the other terns. This implies that "white noddy" would be a more appropriate English name.

The white tern has the following recognized subspecies:

G. a. alba, (Sparrman, 1786): tropical islands of the south Atlantic including Fernando de Noronha, Trinidade, Martin Vas Rocks, Ascension and St. Helena islands
G. a. candida, (Gmelin, 1789): Seychelles & Mascarene Islands to central Pacific including southern Maldives excluding range of G. a. leucopes and Gygis microrhyncha
G. a. leucopes, Holyoak & Thibault, 1976: Pitcairn Islands

Some authors have postulated that there may be three species of Gygis: Gygis alba, in the Atlantic Ocean, and Gygis candida and Gygis microrhyncha, both in the Pacific.

Description
It has white plumage and a long black bill. Nesting on coral islands, usually on trees with small branches but also on rocky ledges and on man-made structures, the white tern feeds on small fish which it catches by plunge diving. Giant tortoises have been observed to hunt the bird on Fregate Island in the Seychelles.

Distribution and habitat
The white tern ranges widely across the Pacific Ocean from the coasts of Chile and Colombia to New Zealand and along the eastern and southern coasts of Asia from China to India, South Maldives, the islands of the Indian Ocean, and the coast of South Africa. Rarely it is also found in Japan, Madagascar, Mexico, and on some islands in the Atlantic Ocean. It is a pelagic and epipelagic bird, living along the coast and moving into wooded areas during the breeding season.

Behavior
This species is notable for laying its egg on bare thin branches in a small fork or depression without a nest. This behaviour is unusual for terns, which generally nest on the ground, and even the related tree-nesting black noddy constructs a nest. It is thought that the reason for the absence of nests is the reduction in nest parasites, which in some colonial seabirds can cause the abandonment of an entire colony. In spite of these benefits there are costs associated with tree nesting, as the eggs and chicks are vulnerable to becoming dislodged by heavy winds. For this reason the white tern is also quick to relay should it lose the egg. The newly hatched chicks have well developed feet with which to hang on to their precarious nesting site. It is a long-lived bird, having been recorded living for 42 years.

Relationship with humans
This is one of the most useful of all the landfinding birds used by Pacific navigators. They generally roam no more than 45 km from their home island, to which they usually return at nightfall. Polynesians also caught these birds for food or to keep as pets.

The white tern, manu-o-Kū, was named Honolulu, Hawaii's official bird on April 2, 2007.

New Zealand's Department of Conservation classifies the white tern as Nationally Critical, with populations having been largely decimated by the introduction of feral cats and rats on Raoul Island, the terns' only breeding site in the country. As of 2016, the white tern population in New Zealand was reported to be increasing following the eradication of introduced predators in 2002. Globally, the white tern has a large range that is home to several large colonies, and both recognised species are listed as Least Concern by the IUCN Red List.

References

Further reading

External links

 White tern videos, photos & sounds on the Internet Bird Collection

white tern
Birds of Norfolk Island
Birds of the Atlantic Ocean
Birds of the Indian Ocean
Birds of the Pacific Ocean
white tern
white tern
Taxa named by Anders Sparrman
white tern
Pantropical fauna